The Society of Saint Pius X (SSPX) (FSSPX) is an international fraternity of traditionalist Catholic priests founded in 1970 by Archbishop Marcel Lefebvre, a leading traditionalist voice at the Second Vatican Council with the , and Superior General of the Holy Ghost Fathers until 1968. The society was initially established as a pious union of the Catholic Church with the permission of François Charrière, the Bishop of Lausanne, Geneva and Fribourg in Switzerland. In 2022, the society reached over 700 priestly members, with 1,135 total members.

The society is named after Pope Pius X, whose anti-Modernist stance the society stresses, retaining the Tridentine Mass and pre-Vatican II liturgical books in Latin for the other sacraments. The present Superior General of the society is the Reverend Davide Pagliarani, who succeeded Bishop Bernard Fellay in 2018. There are a number of organisations derived from the SSPX: most notably the Society of Saint Pius V (SSPV), a group mostly in the United States; and the Priestly Fraternity of Saint Peter (FSSP), which was made a society of apostolic life under Pope John Paul II in 1988.

Tensions between the society and the Holy See reached their height in 1988 with the Écône consecrations: Archbishop Lefebvre consecrated four bishops without the Apostolic Mandate and against a personal warning by Pope John Paul II, resulting in Rome declaring that the bishops who consecrated or were consecrated had incurred  (automatic) excommunication. Though the SSPX denied that the bishops incurred any penalty, claiming canon law in their defense, the declared excommunication of the surviving bishops was at their request removed in 2009 in the hope of speedily reaching "full reconciliation and complete communion".

The society's canonical situation remains unresolved. The 2010s saw growing recognition by the Holy See of its sacramental and pastoral activities, with Papal recognition extended indefinitely in 2017 to confessions heard by its priests, and local ordinaries allowed to grant delegation to its priests for officially witnessing marriages. In addition, the Holy See named SSPX bishop Fellay as judge in a canonical trial against one of the society's priests. The significance of these recognitions is that, unlike other Catholic sacraments, both confession and marriage require canonical jurisdiction for their validity. While its critics claim the society's priests were not explicitly granted the requisite jurisdiction, it contends that they possessed "supplied jurisdiction" for confessions due to a "state of necessity".

History of the SSPX

Like Traditionalist Catholicism in general, the SSPX was born out of opposition to changes in the Catholic Church that followed the Second Vatican Council (1962–1965). The founder and central figure of the society was the French Archbishop Marcel Lefebvre, who had served the Catholic Church as Apostolic Delegate for French-speaking Africa, Archbishop of Dakar, and Superior General of the Congregation of the Holy Spirit, a missionary order of priests.

Foundation of the society 
In September 1970, shortly after his retirement as Superior General of the Congregation of the Holy Spirit, Lefebvre was approached by eleven members of the Pontifical French Seminary in Rome. They sought Lefebvre's advice on a conservative seminary where they could complete their studies. He directed them to the University of Fribourg, in Switzerland.

In late 1970, at age 65, urged by the abbot of Hauterive Abbey and the Dominican theologian Father Marie-Dominique Philippe to teach the seminarians personally, Lefebvre, feeling too old to undertake such a large project, told them he would visit François Charrière, Bishop of Lausanne, Geneva and Fribourg, with a request to set up a religious society. He told them, if he said to go through with it, he would see in it a sign of Divine Providence. (Since 1983, the term "association of the faithful" has replaced .) The Society of Saint Pius X was formally founded, adhering to all canonical norms, and receiving the episcopal blessing and encouragement of the local ordinary. Some Swiss laymen offered the International Seminary of Saint Pius X at Écône to the newly formed group, and in 1971 the first 24 candidates entered, followed by a further 32 in October 1972. Aside from Father Marie-Dominique Philippe, a fellow Dominican, Father Michel-Louis Guérard des Lauriers, one of the brightest theologians of that time, also taught in the Seminary. Guérard des Lauriers subsequently left the position of professor because Lefebvre was "acting like Pontius Pilate" by celebrating the 1965 Interim Mass.

Lefebvre attempted to bypass this stage, and contacted three different departments of the Holy See in order to secure early recognition for his society. He succeeded in obtaining a letter of encouragement from Cardinal John Wright, prefect of the Congregation for the Clergy, but there was no approval from the Holy See congregation responsible for raising an association to the level desired by Lefebvre. Cardinal Wright's letter, dated 18 February 1971, said with regard to the field of competence of Cardinal Wright's own Congregation, that the association "will be able to contribute much to accomplishing the plan drawn up by this Congregation for worldwide sharing of clergy." Cardinal Wright was still recommending prospective seminarians to apply to Écône as late as 1973.

The establishment of the SSPX was unwelcome to a number of churchmen, most notably to the French bishops, whose theological outlook was quite different from that of Lefebvre and who had important connections with the Holy See Cardinal Secretary of State, Jean-Marie Villot. According to one defender of Lefebvre, at the meeting of the French episcopal conference at Lourdes in 1972 the seminary at Écône acquired the nickname —the "wildcat seminary". By November 1974 the French episcopate had indicated that they would not incardinate any of Lefebvre's priests in their dioceses which is the opposite of the desire to incardinate the priests of the society by some Swiss bishops. They also publicly criticised Catholics who remained attached to the Tridentine Mass. By this time, the SSPX had opened additional seminaries in Armada, Michigan, (1973) and in Rome (1974).

Canonical visitation of seminary 
The first sign of curial intervention was a Vatican meeting on 26 March 1974. By June 1974, a commission of cardinals had been formed to inquire into the SSPX, and decided on a canonical visitation of the seminary by two Belgian priests, held 11–13 November 1974. Franz Schmidberger, later superior general of the society, said that their report was favourable. However, the seminarians and staff at Écône were shocked by some liberal theological opinions expressed by the two priests. In what he later described as a mood of "doubtlessly excessive indignation", Lefebvre wrote a declaration denouncing what he considered liberal trends "clearly evident" in the council and in the subsequent reforms. This document was leaked and published in January 1975, in the French Traditionalist Catholic journal Itinéraires.

Lefebvre was in serious difficulties. In January 1975, Bishop Pierre Mamie of Fribourg wrote to Rome stating his intention to withdraw the  status that his predecessor had granted. In the same month, Lefebvre was summoned to the Vatican, meeting with the cardinals on 13 February and 3 March. Lefebvre was surprised by their hostile tone: at one point a French cardinal, Gabriel-Marie Garrone, reportedly called him a "fool".

Growing tensions 
On 6 May 1975, with the approval of the cardinals, Bishop Mamie withdrew the SSPX's  status. Lefebvre instructed his lawyer to lodge appeals, and he ultimately petitioned the Supreme Tribunal of the Apostolic Signatura, which turned down the appeal. From this point onward, the SSPX was no longer recognised as a canonical organization.

Lefebvre and the leadership of the society have always maintained that he was treated unfairly by the Roman Curia, that the suppression of the SSPX was unjust, and that the procedures violated the 1917 Code of Canon Law.

The SSPX continued to operate in spite of its discountenance. In the consistory of 24 May 1976, Pope Paul VI rebuked Archbishop Lefebvre by name—reportedly the first time in 200 years that a pope had publicly reprimanded a Catholic bishop—and appealed to him and his followers to change their minds.

Lefebvre announced that he intended to confer ordination on some of his students at the end of June 1976. On 12 June 1976, the Nuncio in Switzerland was given instructions to inform Lefebvre that, by special order of Pope Paul VI, he was forbidden to do so. On 25 June 1976, Archbishop Giovanni Benelli, the deputy Secretary of State, wrote directly to Lefebvre, confirming, by special mandate of the Pope, the prohibition to administer the holy orders, and warning him of the canonical penalties for Lefebvre himself and those whom he would ordain. Lefebvre ignored the warnings, and went ahead with the ordinations on 29 June 1976.

In the sermon on that occasion, Lefebvre explicitly recognized that he might be struck with suspension, and the new priests with an irregularity that could theoretically prevent them from saying Mass. On the next day, 1 July 1976, the Press Office of the Holy See declared that in accordance with canon 2373 of the then Code of Canon Law, Lefebvre was automatically suspended for one year from conferring ordination, and that those whom he had ordained were automatically suspended from the exercise of the order received. It was also announced that the Holy See was examining Lefebvre's disobedience to the orders of the Pope.

On 11 July 1976, Lefebvre signed a certificate of receipt of a letter from Cardinal Sebastiano Baggio, Prefect of the Congregation for Bishops, intimating that further penalties would be imposed in accordance with canon 2331 §1 of the then Code of Canon Law concerning obstinate disobedience to legitimate precepts or prohibitions of the Roman Pontiff. He was enjoined, within ten days of receipt of the letter, to take steps "to repair the scandal caused." In a letter of 17 July to Pope Paul VI, Lefebvre declared that he judged his action of 29 June to be legitimate. The Pope considered this response inadequate, and on his instructions the Congregation for Bishops, on 22 July 1976, suspended Lefebvre for an indefinite time from all exercise of holy orders—he could not confer any of the Sacraments, save Reconciliation or Baptism in an emergency (suspension ).

The Écône consecrations (1988)

A central controversy surrounding the SSPX concerns the consecration by Archbishop Lefebvre and Brazilian bishop Antônio de Castro Mayer of four SSPX priests as bishops in 1988, in violation of the orders of Pope John Paul II.

By 1987, Archbishop Lefebvre was 81. If he had died at that point, the SSPX could have their members ordained to the priesthood only at the hands of non-SSPX bishops, regarded by Lefebvre as unreliable and non-orthodox. In June 1987, Lefebvre announced his intention to consecrate a successor to the episcopacy. He implied that he intended to do this with or without the approval of the Holy See. In the Catholic Church, a bishop requires the mandate of the Pope if he is to consecrate a bishop, and an unauthorized consecration automatically incurs excommunication. Earlier, Pope Pius XII, in his encyclical , had described the sacramental activity of bishops who had been consecrated without papal approval as "gravely illicit, that is, criminal and sacrilegious". The Roman authorities were grieved by Lefebvre's plan, but they began discussions with him and the SSPX, which led to the signing, on 5 May 1988, of a skeleton agreement between Lefebvre and Cardinal Joseph Ratzinger, the prefect of the Congregation for the Doctrine of the Faith and the future Pope Benedict XVI.

On Pope John Paul II's instructions, Cardinal Ratzinger replied to Lefebvre on 30 May, insisting on observance of the agreement of 5 May and adding that, if Lefebvre carried out unauthorized consecrations on 30 June, the promised authorization for the ordination to the episcopacy would be withdrawn.

On 3 June, Lefebvre wrote that he intended to proceed. On 9 June, the Pope replied with a personal letter, appealing to him to abandon a design that "would be seen as nothing other than a schismatic act, the theological and canonical consequences of which are known to you." Lefebvre did not reply, and the letter was made public on 16 June.

On 30 June 1988, Archbishop Lefebvre proceeded to ordain to the episcopate four priests of the SSPX. Antônio de Castro Mayer, the retired Bishop of Campos dos Goytacazes, Brazil, assisted in the ceremony. Those consecrated as Bishops were: Bernard Fellay, Bernard Tissier de Mallerais, Alfonso de Galarreta, and Richard Williamson.

The following day, the Congregation for Bishops issued a decree declaring that Archbishop Lefebvre and the four newly ordained bishops had incurred the automatic canonical penalty of excommunication reserved to the Holy See. The Pope stated that, since schism is defined in the 1983 Code of Canon Law as "withdrawal of submission to the Supreme Pontiff or from communion with the members of the Church subject to him" (canon 751), the consecration "constitute[d] a schismatic act", and that, by virtue of canon 1382 of the Code, it entailed ipso facto excommunication for all the bishops involved.

Lefebvre argued that his actions had been necessary because the traditional form of the Catholic faith and sacraments would become extinct without Traditionalist clergy to pass them on to the next generation. He called the ordinations  ("Operation Survival"), citing in his defense canons 1323 and 1324 of the 1917 Code of Canon Law, the first of which says that "a person who acted coerced by grave fear, even if only relatively grave, or due to necessity or grave inconvenience unless the act is intrinsically evil or tends to the harm of souls" is not subject to penalty for violating a law or precept, while the other says "the perpetrator of a violation is not exempt from a penalty, but the penalty established by law or precept must be tempered or a penance employed in its place if the delict was committed [...] by a person who thought in culpable error that one of the circumstances mentioned in can. 1323, nn. 4 or 5 was present."

Some members of the SSPX disassociated themselves from the society as a result of Lefebvre's actions and, with the approval of the Holy See, formed a separate society called the Priestly Fraternity of Saint Peter.

Discussions with the Holy See

Discussions between the Holy See and the Society of Saint Pius X towards an eventual reconciliation have been ongoing. For years after the 1988 consecrations, there was little if any dialogue between the SSPX and the Holy See. This state of affairs ended when the society led a large pilgrimage to Rome for the "Great Jubilee" of 2000.

Nine years later, on 21 January 2009 the Holy See remitted the excommunications of the society's bishops that it had declared at the time of the 1988 consecrations and expressed the hope that all members of the society would follow this up by speedily returning to full communion with the Church.

Discussions since then have been complex, stemming from the society's insistence that the teachings of the Second Vatican Council on ecumenism, religious liberty, and collegiality are inconsistent with Catholic teaching and doctrine, a claim that the Holy See views as unacceptable, but recent discussions have indicated the possibility of an understanding. In an interview on 4 March 2017 with DICI, the official news organ of the society, Bishop Bernard Fellay stated: "Whether it is a question of religious liberty, collegiality, ecumenism, the new Mass, or even the new rites of the sacraments [...] And now all of a sudden, on these points that have been stumbling blocks, the emissaries from Rome tell us that they are open questions." In the same month of March 2017, Archbishop Guido Pozzo, the prelate in charge of the Pontifical Commission Ecclesia Dei, the Roman Curia's organ for traditionalist societies, stated that the Holy See and the society were close to an agreement regularizing the society's status. In a letter of the same month it was announced that Pope Francis authorized diocesan bishops to grant to SSPX priests faculties to officiate at a marriage valid in the Catholic Church in cases where no priest in good standing could do so.

In July 2017 Bishop Fellay signed a document along with a number of other clergy and academics labeled as a "Filial Correction" of Pope Francis. In twenty-five page document, which was made public in September after receiving no reply from the Holy See, they criticized the Pope for allegedly promoting heresy through various words, actions and omissions during his pontificate.

Canonical situation

The canonical situation of the SSPX and of its clergy has been the subject of controversy since the 1988 Écône consecrations. A 1995 letter from the Pontifical Commission stated that there is "no doubt about the validity of the ordination of the priests of the Society of St. Pius X. They are, however, suspended ."

Marriage 
In 2008, the Pontifical Commission  had stated: "The priests of the Society of St. Pius X are [...] prohibited from exercising their priestly functions," going on to say that matrimony "require[s] that the priest enjoys the faculties of the diocese or has proper delegation. Since that is not the case with these priests, these sacraments are invalid."

On 27 March 2017, the Congregation for the Doctrine of the Faith communicated that Pope Francis had decided to grant local ordinaries the right to give to a priest in good standing the faculty to preside at the marriage of followers of the society, immediately after which they will participate in a Mass celebrated by an SSPX priest, or, if no priest in good standing can receive the consent of the couple, to give the faculty instead to an SSPX priest.

Fr. Z commented that suspended priests cannot receive faculties. "If the SSPX priests can receive faculties, and they have, all over the place, then they are not suspended."

Confession 
On 20 November 2016, Pope Francis personally and indefinitely extended an allowance he created during the Holy Year of 2015 for penitents confessing to priests affiliated with the SSPX: "For the Jubilee Year I had also granted that those faithful who, for various reasons, attend churches officiated by the priests of the Priestly Fraternity of Saint Pius X, can validly and licitly receive the sacramental absolution of their sins."

Ordination and Holy Orders 
During an interview with TV Libertes on 29 January 2017, Bishop Fellay announced that theological discussions with the Holy See had led to permission for the society to licitly ordain priests: "This summer it was confirmed that the Superior General can freely ordain the priests of the society without having to ask permission from the local bishop."

Mass 
In 2020, Father Edward McNamara, professor of liturgy and dean of theology at the Pontifical Athenaeum Regina Apostolorum in Rome, reaffirmed the statement he made in 2011, before Pope Benedict granted certain faculties in favor of SSPX priests. After declaring that "the Masses celebrated by members of the Society of St. Pius X are valid but illicit, i.e., contrary to Canon Law", he said: "The mere fact of assisting at a Mass of this society is not a sin. It would only become so if a person attended this Mass with the deliberate intention of separating himself from communion with the Pope and those in communion with him. I would say, therefore, that a conscientious Catholic should not knowingly attend a Mass celebrated by a priest not in good standing with the Church." He added: "Only if there is objectively no alternative should one attend the Mass celebrated by a priest from the Society of St. Pius X. If one has to do so, then I would say that one may go in good conscience and receive Communion at such a Mass. It would also fulfill the Sunday obligation", and explained that "alternative" is not limited to "Mass in the extraordinary form": a Catholic who seeks this form but finds none available other than the SSPX celebration "should attend an ordinary form Mass or even any Eastern Catholic celebration so as to remain in full Catholic communion".

Jurisdiction 
When told by a journalist of InfoVaticana, a provider of religious information founded in Madrid in October 2013, that what Pope Francis had decided in March 2017 was instead that, "from now on, the weddings celebrated by the priests from the FSSPX are going to be recognized," Cardinal Raymond Leo Burke, who had not seen the actual document, remarked: "That is a very significant action of the Holy Father, and it also indicates that in some way there must be a reconciliation of the SSPX because basically what the Pope is saying is that the priests in this society, when they witness marriages, are exercising jurisdiction in the Roman Catholic Church." In reality, it is local ordinaries, not the society, that in the document are authorized, if they wish, to delegate jurisdiction to SSPX priests to assist canonically at some marriages.

The Society's view is that, before Pope Francis's authorizations, their priests held "supplied" jurisdiction (power of governance) for confessions and marriages. They received this supplied jurisdiction by law and not "by delegation or by mandate of the Sovereign Pontiff or the diocesan bishops or of regularly appointed parish priests."

Since the grants by Pope Francis, the society says that its priests have or can have ordinary jurisdiction for the sacraments of confession and marriage. It adds that, in cases where a diocesan bishop refuses to grant delegation for a marriage, SSPX priests can still use extraordinary jurisdiction.

Allies and supporters 
The SSPX has received explicit support from the following diocesan bishops and cardinals:

 Alfredo Cardinal Ottaviani, Pre-Prefect of the Sacred Congregation for the Doctrine of the Faith, Rome (deceased)
 Antonio Cardinal Bacci, Cardinal Protodeacon, Rome (deceased)
 John Joseph Cardinal Wright, Bishop-Emeritus of Pittsburgh, Prefect of the Congregation for the Clergy, Rome (deceased)
 Antônio de Castro Mayer, bishop of the Roman Catholic Diocese of Campos, Brazil (deceased)
 Salvador L. Lazo, Bishop of San Fernando de La Unión, Philippines (deceased)
 John Bosco Manat Chuabsamai, Bishop of Ratchaburi, Thailand (deceased)
 Athanasius Schneider, auxiliary bishop of Mary Most Holy in Astana, Kazakhstan
 Vitus Huonder, retired Bishop Emeritus of Chur, Switzerland
 Carlo Maria Viganò, archbishop and former Secretary-General of Vatican City and Apostolic Nuncio to the United States

Bishop De Castro-Mayer resigned canonically on 20 August 1981; he later participated in the 1988 Écône consecrations, declaring "my presence here at this ceremony is a matter of conscience: It is the duty of a profession of the Catholic Faith before the entire Church." After his retirement, Bishop Mayer founded the Priestly Union of St. Jean-Marie Vianney, which remained closely associated with the SSPX until 2001, when it reconciled with the Holy See.

The society now has close links with the Priestly Society of Saint Josaphat, led by Father Basil Kovpak, a priest formerly of the Ukrainian Greek Catholic Church, who was definitively excommunicated from the Catholic Church in November 2007 after having Bishop Richard Williamson, then of the SSPX but expelled from the society five years later, ordain two priests and seven deacons for his society in accused violation of canons 1015 §1 and 1017 of the Code of Canon Law.

In May 2019, the SSPX announced that Vitus Huonder, Bishop of Chur, Switzerland, as per a long stated intention, had retired to one of the society's houses in order "to dedicate himself to prayer and silence, to celebrate the traditional Mass exclusively, and to work for Tradition, the only way of renewing the Church." He was warmly received by the SSPX: "The Society of Saint Pius X appreciates Bishop Huonder’s courageous decision and rejoices to be able to provide him with the spiritual and priestly surroundings that he desires so deeply. May this example be followed by others, so as to 'restore everything in Christ'."

In a letter addressed on 1 September 2020 to Catholic Family News Archbishop Carlo Maria Viganò, former Secretary-General of the Vatican City State and former Apostolic Nuncio to the United States, said that the work of the SSPX "deserves recognition for not having allowed the flame of Tradition to be extinguished at a moment in which celebrating the ancient Mass was considered subversive and a reason for excommunication. [...] If their fidelity made disobedience to the pope inevitable with the episcopal consecrations, thanks to them the Society was able to protect herself from the furious attack of the Innovators and by its very existence it allowed the possibility of the liberalization of the Ancient Rite, which until then was prohibited. Its presence also allowed the contradictions and errors of the conciliar sect to emerge, always winking at heretics and idolaters but implacably rigid and intolerant towards Catholic Truth."

Several religious institutes, mostly based in France, are associated with the society.

SSPX today

, the society had 637 priests present in 37 countries and active in 35 more, 772 Mass centers, 167 priories, 123 religious brothers, 200 religious sisters, 79 oblates, 204 seminarians in six seminaries, 56 pre-seminarians in three pre-seminaries, more than 100 schools, 7 nursing homes, 4 Carmelite convents, 19 Missionary Sisters of Kenya, and 2 university-level institutes. , the society had 680 priests and 217 seminarians. Edizioni Piane is the FSSPX's official and international publishing house.

The society is divided into two classes of territorial units called districts and autonomous houses, each headed by a superior.  An autonomous house may become a district after three priories have been established within its jurisdiction. The most recent organizational addition of the society is the Autonomous House of Central America and the Caribbean, formed from territory taken from the District of Mexico, erected on 1 October 2017. Over 120 (>20%) of the society's priests are stationed in the District of France.

The society expanded its mission in Asia and Poland, where the society managed to triple the number of chapels from 2019 to 2021.

, the society was sub-divided into 14 districts, and 5 autonomous houses:

The first seminary founded by the society is the St. Pius X International Seminary located in Écône, Switzerland. Its largest is located in the United States: St. Thomas Aquinas Seminary, Dillwyn, VA, and having outgrown its previous facilities, relocated in 2016 from Winona, Minnesota; the former seminary complex continues to house the novitiate of the religious brothers. Other seminaries are located in France ( Seminary, Flavigny-sur-Ozerain), Germany (Sacred Heart of Jesus Seminary, Zaitzkofen), and Argentina (La Reja). However, due to the closure of Australia's international borders, and unprecedented lockdowns and constraints because of COVID-19, The society's Holy Cross Seminary (Golbourn) can no longer accept seminarians from nearby countries, thereby closing the seminary and moving their present seminarians to other seminaries of the SSPX. The society also runs pre-seminaries for prospective priestly vocations in Italy (Albano Laziale), Brazil (Santa Maria), and the Philippines (Santa Barbara, Iloilo).

Superiors General

Notable groups that have split from the SSPX

There have been two major kinds of splits from the SSPX. Two notable splits of the first kind involved priests who viewed the SSPX as too liberal and who use the form that the Mass had before Pope John XXIII. The other kind involved groups who have reconciled with the Holy See and who, like the SSPX, use the 1962 edition of the Roman Missal.

Groups which broke with the SSPX and are not recognized by the Holy See include:
 Society of Saint Pius VIn 1983, nine U.S. SSPX priests broke with or were forced to leave the SSPX's Northeast USA District partly because they were opposed to Lefebvre's instructions that Mass be celebrated according to the 1962 edition of the Roman Missal issued by Pope John XXIII.  Those in SSPX circles refer to these priests as "the nine". They began their organization by refusing to complete a transaction of a church that the SSPX was attempting to purchase, using one of the nine priests as the buyer.  The founding priests took the money intended for the purchase of the church and kept the church for themselves. A number of the SSPV's priests and the lay people who go to their Masses are openly sedevacantist, a thesis rejected by the SSPX.  Other issues occasioning the split were: Lefebvre's order that Society priests must accept the decrees of nullity handed down by diocesan marriage tribunals; the insistence that all Society Masses be celebrated according to the 1962 edition of the Roman Missal; the acceptance of new members into the group who had been ordained to the priesthood according to the revised sacramental rites of Pope Paul VI.
 Istituto Mater Boni Consilii – (English: "Institute of the Mother of Good Counsel") is a traditionalist congregation of priests that follows the sedeprivationist school of thought. The founders of the institute seceded in 1985 from the Society of St. Pius X under the leadership of Fr. Francesco Ricossa, onetime faculty member of the seminary at Écône. In contrast to the North American-based SSPV, this Institute is based in Europe.

Groups which broke with the SSPX and reconciled with Rome include:
 Priestly Fraternity of Saint Peter (FSSP)It was established in 1988 after the Écône consecrations. Responding to the Holy See's declaration that these constituted a schismatic act and that those involved were thereby automatically excommunicated, twelve priests left the society and established the Fraternity, in full communion with the Holy See.
 Institute of the Good Shepherd(IBP) was established as a papally-recognized society of apostolic life on 8 September 2006 for a group of SSPX members who maintained it was time for the society to accept reconciliation with Pope Benedict XVI.
 Sons of the Most Holy Redeemer (FSSR) also known Transalpine Redemptorists, founded as a religious community affiliated with the SSPX in 1988. In 2008 the community petitioned to be reconciled with the Holy See, which was accepted by then Pope Benedict XVI.

Lifestyle and clothing among adherents
In the Society of Saint Pius X, a complementarian position with respect to gender roles is upheld; "In St. Mary's, few married women work, especially once they have children."

Richard Williamson, a former bishop of the SSPX who now aligns with the SSPX Resistance, wrote a pastoral letter, in which he stated that "women's trousers, as worn today, short or long, modest or immodest, tight or loose, open or disguised (like the "culottes"), are an assault upon woman's womanhood and so they represent a deep-lying revolt against the order willed by God." The Atlantic, in covering SSPX, described their female adherents as being "Women in long, modest skirts [who were loading] vans that had enough seats to accommodate eight or nine kids".

During Mass, though there is no strict dress code, the SSPX advises “Sunday best" attire. Women are recommended to wear skirts that fall at least below the knee, and no tight fitting clothing. It is customary for women to wear a headcovering during prayer and worship. Men are encouraged to wear suits and ties.

The SSPX opposes the presence of television in the household, teaching that it is an occasion of sin.

Controversies

Political 

After Bishop Richard Williamson, the subject of the complaint by the Anti-Defamation League, denied the use of Nazi gas chambers to massacre Jews in a 2009 interview, the superior general of the society said that, if he repeated his denial, he would be expelled. His actual expulsion in 2012 was for refusing to show due respect and obedience to the SSPX authorities and calling on the superior general to resign. Williamson was later convicted of Holocaust denial by a German court. The society condemns Nazism, following the principles in Pope Pius XI's 1937 encyclical , which denounces Nazi principles and policies and "condemns racial theories and the mistreatment of people because of their race or nationality but does not refer to Hitler or the Nazis by name".

The society publishes in its magazine The Angelus a collection of quotations praising Pius XII for his work in saving Jews from Nazi persecution and in condemning Nazi principles.

French Nazi collaborator and war criminal Paul Touvier was arrested in an SSPX priory. The superiors of the priory claimed that had granted him asylum as "an act of charity to a homeless man". They claimed no knowledge about the man's background when he first appeared in the priory. On his death, in 1996, an SSPX Requiem Mass was offered for his soul, upon his request.

On 16 October 2013, the society offered to perform a funeral for Nazi war criminal Erich Priebke. Priebke had been baptized in a Protestant denomination, but in post-war years he converted to a form of  Catholicism with his wife and had his children baptized. He rejected the cult of race as a "mistake that led down a path of no return." The ceremony did not take place due to protests by some 500 people, outside the society's Italian district house in Albano, near Rome. The local authorities of the Catholic Church refused him a public funeral, citing a rule of canon law that, unless they gave some signs of repentance before death, a public funeral must be refused to manifest sinners to whom it cannot be granted without public scandal of the faithful.

In spite of controversies surrounding Nazism, the society mentioned that Archbishop Lefebvre's own father, René Lefebvre, met his death in the concentration camp at Sonnenburg in February 1944, three years after his arrest by the Gestapo; he died, "his rosary in hand, a victim of Nazi insanity."

The society is also known for supporting the far-right, extremist, nationalist, ultra-conservative political party, Civitas in France. Since then, under the new leadership of the said movement, the Civitas is no longer under the auspice of the society and the "chaplaincy" is now held by the Franciscan Capuchin Friars of Morgon, a religious community affiliated to the SSPX. However, Civitas still holds rallies, conferences, and meetings in SSPX chapels and still get endorsements from their priests and the French District itself.

Alleged cover-up of abuse 
On 5 April 2017, Uppdrag granskning, a Swedish television program focused on investigative journalism, alleged that four members of the SSPX—three priests and a former seminarian—had molested at least a dozen young people in several countries. The program also stated that evidence of abuse was kept secret by the SSPX and that the priests were allowed to continue in ministry. Nonetheless, three of the four had been expelled from the society by the time that the program was aired.

Kevin Gerard Sloniker, the former seminarian and the only person accused by name in the program, was expelled from the society's St. Thomas Aquinas Seminary in 2005, and began serving a life-sentence in 2015. The remaining three accusations regard priests whose names have been withheld (referred to in the program as Fathers P, S, and M); their accusers have likewise remained anonymous. Nonetheless, P was the subject of a canonical trial presided over by Bishop Fellay, authorized by the Holy See in 2013; he was found guilty, and subsequently ordered to retire to a monastery. Crux reports "P refused to go and, according to officials of the SSPX, joined [Bishop] Williamson's Resistance." He along with "Father S" were expelled from the society, and are now affiliated with Williamson's group. "Father M" is currently serving in France, though no criminal charges have been brought against him and the society denies that they are aware of any credible accusations of abuse against the priest.

In May 2020, the Kansas Bureau of Investigation stated that, as part of its investigation into the four Catholic dioceses in the state, it was also investigating accusations that SSPX members were either perpetrating or covering up clerical sex abuse in the state. The SSPX St. Mary's Rectory in Kansas faced sex abuse allegations. Although the U.S. district of the society, as well as the St. Mary's Rectory denied the said allegations.

Priests sentenced for abuse 

Mexican SSPX priest and former headmaster Father Uribe Silviano Bernabé was sentenced in September 2004 by a Bordeaux criminal court to one year for sexual assaults on an adult woman and a 13-year-old girl. He appealed the sentence and lost on 17 March 2005. He then brought the case to the Court of Cassation in Paris, which upheld the sentence on 26 April 2006.

On 13 December 2017, Father Frédéric Abbet was sentenced to 5 years by a Brussels appeal court for sexual abuse on a young boy in an SSPX boarding school. He had already faced accusations in his native Switzerland in 2005 but had been acquitted by an unofficial SSPX tribunal. Father Abbet was to serve the prison sentence in his native Switzerland, where it was later discovered he never did serve his prison sentence but instead lived freely in the community.

On 16 February 2018, former school headmaster Father Christophe Roisnel was sentenced to 19 years by the Nanterre criminal court of appeal for multiple counts of rape and acts of torture on female school teachers.

See also

 SSPX-affiliated religious orders
 Controversies surrounding the Society of Saint Pius X
 Institute of consecrated life
 Minaret controversy in Switzerland
 Priestly Society of Saint Josaphat, a related group in the Ukrainian Greek Catholic Church
 Society of St Pius X in New Zealand
 St. Mary's College, Kansas
 St. Dominic's College, Wanganui
 The International Seminary of Saint Pius X

References

External links

 
 Website of district of the USA
 Official French website

 
Traditionalist Catholicism
Christian organizations established in 1970
Second Vatican Council
Pius X
Traditionalist Catholics
Communities using the Tridentine Mass
Catholic Church sexual abuse scandals in France